Cave Place may refer to:

Cave Place (Mooresville, Alabama), formerly listed on the National Register of Historic Places in Limestone County, Alabama
Cave Place (Lexington, Kentucky), listed on the National Register of Historic Places in Fayette County, Kentucky